Christoph Silber (often credited as Chris Silber), born 26 April 1971 in Berlin, is a German-American author and filmmaker.  Rated among "Europe's hottest new screenwriters" by Screen International, Silber works and lives in the United States.

Early life
Silber spent most of his childhood and youth in Germany. Raised bilingual, he studied in London and Berlin. His mother is a philosopher and award-winning literary translator, his foster father was a well-known Shakespeare scholar and dramaturge. Silber's step-grandmother fought the Nazis in WWII as a Soviet secret agent. His grandfather was a denazification officer for the Allied Forces and confronted former Nazi leaders after the war. Writing runs in Silber's family, with several journalists and published authors in his bloodline.

Career

Silber worked as an actor, translator and journalist prior to his professional writing career.  Taking advantage of his bilingual upbringing, he translated film-related books and screenplays for German book publishers, including Quentin Tarantino's Pulp Fiction.  The book became a best-seller and led to Silber's first assignment as a playwright.  In 1995 the acclaimed Vienna Burgtheater asked him to adapt Puccini's Tosca for a stage production.  This led to further theatre work and connections in the film industry.

Silber's screenwriting career began in European television in the mid-1990s.  A genre traveller, Silber worked as a head writer of sitcoms as well as crime series.  Silber has collaborated on numerous films, including the award-winning Good Bye, Lenin!, North Face, Arranged and My Last Day Without You, for which he also co-wrote several songs performed by Nicole Beharie.  He also established himself in the family entertainment market with his feature film scripts for the highly successful Enid Blyton-based Hanni & Nanni franchise. Several of his contributions to German television have broken ratings records. 

Based in Los Angeles since 2012, Silber has been honoured by the Vilcek Foundation as "an immigrant filmmaker...whose creative spirit enlivens and inspires American cinema."

In 2019, Silber sold a WWII series pilot inspired by his grandfather's story to Hollywood-based Blitz Films. In 2021, Disney+ announced Sam - A Saxon, a mini-series co-created by Silber, as their first German original production with him attached as a head writer.

Personal life

Silbers former wife Joleita, who inspired his film My Last Day Without You, died from cancer in 2013. He reflected on his family's grief journey in his children's book The Cloud In Our House (Die Wolke Unterm Dach), which was released in Germany in 2022.
In 2022 Silber married the American actress and writer Tracey Graves. In 2023 they founded their production company SilberLove Productions, with their first co-writing venture The Gifted Family shooting in Germany the same year. The couple can be heard dishing out dating and marriage advice on their podcast Love Life Hacks.

Filmography

Theatrical

 2022: Cloud In The Attic (writer, story)
 2017: I'm Off Then (writer)
 2015: The Trapp Family – A Life Of Music (writer)
 2015: Azure (short; director, producer)
 2013:  (writer)
 2013: Hanni & Nanni 3 (writer)
 2012: Hanni & Nanni 2 (writer)
 2011: My Last Day Without You (writer, producer)
 2010: Devil's Kickers (writer)
 2010: The Albanian (writer)
 2010: Young Goethe in Love (script consultant)
 2008: Die Tränen meiner Mutter (writer)
 2008: North Face (writer)
 2007: Arranged (script consultant)
 2007: Mrs. Ratcliffe's Revolution (script consultant)
 2006: Ice Wind (short; writer, director, actor)
 2004: The Ring Thing (writer, producer)
 2003: Good Bye, Lenin! (collaborator on screenplay)
 2001: Julietta (writer)
 2001: Brooklyn Bridge (short; writer)

Television

 2023: The Gifted Family (writer)
 2023: Perfect Match (writer)
 2023: Sam - A Saxon (miniseries, co-creator & head writer)
 2022: 5 Hours - The Miracle of Cape Town (writer)
 2019: Walpurgis Night (miniseries, creator & writer)
 2017: Balaton Residence (miniseries, co-creator & writer)
 2016: Rivals Forever (miniseries, co-creator & writer)
 2015: The New Girl (writer)
 2014: Dresden Homicide (crime series; creator & head writer)
 2012: A Day for a Miracle (writer)
 2011: Girl on the Ocean Floor (writer)
 2010: Love Is Just A Word (writer)
 2006-today: Tatort (crime series; writer & head writer)
 2006–2010: Der Kriminalist (crime series; writer & head writer)
 2004: My Best Years (series; head writer)
 2000: Trivial Pursuit (writer)

Awards and nominations

Wins

 2022 Hamburg Film Festival: Best TV Film The Miracle of Cape Town 2016 Munich Film Festival: Best TV Film or Miniseries Rivals Forever 2016 Romy Award: Best TV Film Berlin One 2013 International Emmy: Best TV Film or Miniseries A Day for a Miracle 2012 Romy Award: Best Screenplay A Day for a Miracle 2012 Black Reel Awards: Best Independent Film My Last Day Without You 2012 Golden Sparrow Award: Best Children's Film Hanni & Nanni 2 2011 Brooklyn Film Festival: Best Producer My Last Day Without You 2011 Max Ophüls Award: Best Film The Albanian 2011 Hawaii International Film Festival: AIFP honoree, sponsored by the Vilcek Foundation
 2009 German Film Critics Award: Best Screenplay North Face
 2009 Grimme Award: Audience Award Tatort: Auf der Sonnenseite 2007 Brooklyn Film Festival: Best Film Arranged
 2001 Brooklyn Film Festival: Best Film JuliettaNominations

 2016 Civis media prize: Best TV Film The New Girl 2013 Grimme Award: Best TV Film A Day for a Miracle 
 2013 Montblanc Screenplay Award: Banklady 
 2012 Black Reel Awards: Best Original Song My Last Day Without You 
 2009 Golden Camera: Best TV Film Tatort: Auf der Sonnenseite''

References

External links
 
  Personal Blog

1971 births
Living people
German screenwriters
German male screenwriters
German television writers
German male writers
Mass media people from Berlin
German emigrants to the United States